Paweł Kucharczyk (born 4 May 1997) is a Polish professional footballer who plays as a centre-back for Stal Stalowa Wola.

Career
Kucharczyk began his career with FC Wrocław Academy, who impressed many teams in the youth league with his performances. He had trials with Sandecja Nowy Sącz before joining Ślęza Wrocław for the 2016–17 season. In 2017 Kucharczyk joined Śląsk Wrocław going into the Śląsk reserves, making his Śląsk first team debut in the 2–1 defeat to Pogoń Szczecin, playing the full 90 minutes.

Honours

Club
Górnik Polkowice
II liga: 2020–21

References

External links

1997 births
Living people
Polish footballers
Association football defenders
Śląsk Wrocław players
Górnik Polkowice players
Stal Stalowa Wola players
Ekstraklasa players
I liga players
II liga players